The National Anti-Gambling League (NAGL) was a British campaigning organization founded in 1890 by F. A. Atkins. The aims of the NAGL were laid out in its journal, the Bulletin of the National Anti-Gambling League:

NAGL Members included John Hawke, J. A. Hobson, Ramsay MacDonald and Seebohm Rowntree.

References

Gambling and society
Gambling in the United Kingdom
1890 establishments in England
Organizations established in 1890